Forssman is the surname of the following people
Darren Forssman (born in 1970), Australian rules footballer
John Forssman (1868–1947), Swedish pathologist and bacteriologist
Sven Forssman (1882–1919), Swedish gymnast

See also
Börjeson–Forssman–Lehmann syndrome, rare genetic disease
Siemens-Schuckert Forssman, bomber aircraft prototype
Werner Forssmann (1904–1979), German physician, Nobel Prize in Medicine
Forsman